The Kerameikos Archaeological Museum is located in Kerameikos, Athens, Greece and was built in 1937.  It houses many important early Geometric art pieces that date as far back as 860 BC.  It was expanded in the 1960s by the Boehringer brothers of Boehringer Ingelheim fame.  Its official address is Ermou, Athens 125, Greece.

History

In 1863, archaeologists first started housing pottery and other artifacts found in the dig site in a small, makeshift outpost.  It was  an exhibit for the larger German Archaeological Institute until the official Museum was built in 1937, by H. Johannes.  It was funded by Gustav Oberlander, a Prussian entrepreneur. The museum is housed directly in the area of Kerameikos among the famous archaeological site.  The Boehringer brothers funded the expansion of the museum.  It is a small, open-air museum with only four rooms on a single floor, but it houses many important funerary works as well as larger sculptures.  Inside of the museum there is a garden area with olive trees and laurels.

Exhibits

Three of the rooms house artifacts found in the Kerameikos necropolis, the other room houses sculptures found from all archaeological eras.  Many of the artifacts found in Kerameikos are funerary or otherwise death-related and reflect the Athenian attitudes towards the afterlife.  As such, many of the sculptures exhibited here are urns, lekythoi, grave reliefs, stelae, in addition to jewelry, etc.  Some of the most notable findings are from the offerings to plague victims of the Plague of Athens.  There are works from the Archaic, Classical, Hellenistic, and Roman periods.

Stolen artefacts

In 1982, a black-figure lekythos was stolen from the archaeological museum.

See also
Boxer Stele Fragment from Kerameikos
Kerameikos steles

References

 
 
 http://odysseus.culture.gr/h/1/gh151.jsp?obj_id=3443

External links 

Archaeological museums in Athens
Museums established in 1937
1937 establishments in Greece
Kerameikos